The 1983 Bauchi State gubernatorial election occurred in Nigeria on August 13, 1983. The NPN nominee Tatari Ali won the election, defeating other candidates.

Tatari Ali emerged NPN candidate.

Electoral system
The Governor of Bauchi State is elected using the plurality voting system.

Primary election

NPN primary
The NPN primary election was won by Tatari Ali.

Results

References 

Bauchi State gubernatorial elections
Bauchi State gubernatorial election
Bauchi State gubernatorial election